Kastellet is a light rail tram stop on the Oslo Tramway.

Located at Kastellet in Nordstrand, the station is situated between Sørli and Bråten. It was opened on 11 June 1917. It is served by lines 13 and 19 and is served by both SL79 and SL95 trams. There is also a bus stop which is served by routes 75A and 75B of Ruter's bus network.  It is approximately 100 metres away from the tram stop. There is a shelter at the station, which was built in the 1990s, along with many other stations on the Ekeberg Line. It is a copy of Erik Glosimodt's original art nouveau style.

References

Oslo Tramway stations in Oslo
Railway stations opened in 1917
1917 establishments in Norway